Fibromodulin is a protein that in humans is encoded by the FMOD gene.

Fibromodulin is a 42kDa protein of a family of small interstitial leucine-rich repeat proteoglycans (SLRPs). It can have up to four N-linked keratan sulfate chains attached to the core protein within the leucine-rich region. It shares significant sequence homology with biglycan and decorin.

Function 

Fibromodulin participates in the assembly of the collagen fibers of the extracellular matrix. It binds to the same site on the collagen type I molecule as lumican. It also inhibits fibrillogenesis of collagen type I and collagen type III in vitro. It regulates TGF-beta activities by sequestering TGF-beta into the extracellular matrix.

Clinical significance 

There is an age-dependent decline in the synthesis of keratan sulfate chains, so non-glycated forms of fibromodulin can accumulate in tissues such as cartilage.

Fibromodulin is found in the epidermis of human skin and is expressed by skin cells (keratinocytes) in culture. Mice with the gene for fibromodulin knocked out (Fmod-/-) have very fragile skin and  abnormal tail and Achilles tendons. The collagen fiber bundles in these tendons are fewer and disorganised and there is less endotenon surrounding the tendon tissue. The levels of lumican, a SLRP with one of the same collagen binding sites as fibromodulin, is increased 4 fold in the tail tendons of Fmod-knockout mice.

References

Further reading 

 
 
 
 
 
 
 
 
 
 
 
 
 

Extracellular matrix proteins
Glycoproteins